Lathbury is a village and civil parish in the City of Milton Keynes, Buckinghamshire, England. It is just to the north of Newport Pagnell and just outside the Milton Keynes urban area.

History 
The village name is an Old English language word, meaning 'fortification built with laths or beams'.  In the Domesday Book of 1086 the village was listed as Latesberie.

On the Dissolution of the Monasteries, the advowson of Latbbury Abbey was given to the Dean and Chapter of Christ Church, Oxford. The manor of Lathbury, and Lathbury Park house, has descended through various families, including Lord Vaux, the Earl of Essex and the Andrews baronets. The current Lathbury Park is a Grade II listed house dating from 1801, and incorporating elements from the earlier manor house.  

There was also once a 'free school' in a chapel in the churchyard, founded in the reign of Queen Elizabeth I, leased to the schoolmaster by Christ Church College.  The school was pulled down in 1698 and the materials thereof used to repair the ancient rectory.

The parish church, All Saints Church is a Grade I listed building, of 12th century origin.

References

External links

Villages in Buckinghamshire
Areas of Milton Keynes
Civil parishes in Buckinghamshire